Makarovo is a rural locality (a village) in Florishchinskoye Rural Settlement, Kolchuginsky District, Vladimir Oblast, Russia. The population was 3 as of 2010. There are 4 streets.

Geography 
Makarovo is located 15 km northwest of Kolchugino (the district's administrative centre) by road. Metallist is the nearest rural locality.

References 

Rural localities in Kolchuginsky District